The execution of Dennis McGuire occurred on January 16, 2014, at the Southern Ohio Correctional Facility in Lucasville, Ohio, in what was considered to be a botched execution. McGuire was executed via lethal injection using a new combination of untried and untested drugs: midazolam and hydromorphone. During the execution, witnesses reported that McGuire could be seen struggling to breathe, and reportedly gasped loudly while making snorting and choking sounds for at least ten minutes. It took over twenty-five minutes for McGuire to die, in a process that should normally take just over eight minutes.

The execution led to an unofficial moratorium on capital punishment in Ohio for over three years. McGuire's family filed a civil rights lawsuit against the state and an Illinois drug company. The lawsuit was later dropped by the family after the Ohio Department of Rehabilitation and Correction announced it would abandon the execution method it had used on McGuire. The state did not carry out another execution until July 2017.

Background
Dennis B. McGuire (February 10, 1960 – January 16, 2014) was sentenced to death on December 8, 1994, for the 1989 rape and murder of 22-year-old Joy Stewart in West Alexandria, Ohio. Stewart disappeared on February 11, 1989, and her body was found by two hikers the following day in the woods near Bantas Creek. An autopsy was performed, and it was determined she had died from having her throat cut by a knife, which had severed her carotid artery and jugular vein. No leads came in for the case until December 1989, when McGuire, who was in prison for an unrelated crime, spoke with police, and told them that his brother-in-law had murdered Stewart.

McGuire knew details about the crime that had not been made public, making investigators take his allegation seriously. However, as new details emerged, it became apparent that McGuire had been the actual perpetrator. DNA testing carried out in 1992 proved that McGuire had raped and murdered Stewart. On December 22, 1993, McGuire was charged with one count of aggravated murder, two counts of rape, and one count of kidnapping. On December 8, 1994, McGuire was found guilty of all charges, and the jury recommended a death sentence.

Execution
McGuire spent over nineteen years on death row until his execution date, which was scheduled for January 16, 2014. In September 2013, the state of Ohio ran out of the drug pentobarbital. The drug, originally manufactured in Denmark, was subject to strict export licenses that prevented it being sold to departments of correction within the United States. European-based manufacturers banned prisons in the United States from using their drugs in executions. Because of this, the state of Ohio was forced to use a new combination of drugs to execute McGuire.

The state decided on a combination of the drugs midazolam, a sedative, and hydromorphone, an opioid painkiller. The combination had never been tried or tested before. McGuire's lawyers had warned ahead of the proceeding that the new combination of drugs may subject McGuire to air hunger, which would cause him to suffocate to death. In court proceedings, an Ohio state prosecutor bluntly stated that McGuire was not [necessarily and automatically] entitled to a painless execution, and a judge allowed the execution to proceed.

At 10:28a.m. on the morning of January 16, 2014, at the Southern Ohio Correctional Facility, McGuire was injected with both drugs after he gave a final statement. According to a witness at the execution, four minutes into the procedure, McGuire could be seen struggling and gasping loudly for air. He made snorting and choking sounds, which lasted for at least ten to fifteen minutes. At 10:53a.m., McGuire was pronounced dead. The execution took over twenty-five minutes, in a process that should have normally taken around eight. It was the longest execution ever recorded in Ohio.

His last meal was roast beef, fried chicken, a bagel with cream cheese, fried potatoes with onions, potato salad, butter pecan ice cream, and a Coke.

Aftermath
Following the execution, McGuire's family planned to sue the state of Ohio for inflicting cruel and unusual punishment in violation of the US constitution. A professor of anesthesia at Harvard Medical School told an Ohio court that using midazolam was inappropriate in an execution, and that the state ran the risk of McGuire being conscious for up to five minutes while suffocating. The human rights group Reprieve also released a statement in response, saying they were shocked that the state had gone ahead with the execution, despite the warnings from experts.

All pending executions in Ohio were put on hold, and an unofficial moratorium on capital punishment in Ohio was declared by Governor John Kasich. The state then tried to find compounded or specially mixed versions of lethal drugs, but was unsuccessful. Kasich later signed a bill into law that shielded the names of companies that provide the state of Ohio with lethal injection drugs.

Over a year later, McGuire's family dropped its civil rights lawsuit against the state after the Ohio Department of Rehabilitation and Correction announced it would abandon the execution method it had used on McGuire in favor of alternative anesthetics. The decision satisfied McGuire's family. Kasich ruled out looking for alternative execution methods, such as hanging or firing squad.

It took over three years before Ohio planned to resume executions with a new, three-drug combination: midazolam, rocuronium bromide, and potassium chloride. The combination was FDA-approved. In July 2017, convicted murderer Ronald Philips was the next person to be executed after McGuire, using the new three-drug combination.

See also
 Capital punishment in Ohio
 Capital punishment in the United States
 Execution of Jeffrey Landrigan
 Execution of Clayton Lockett
 Execution of Joseph Wood
 List of botched executions
 List of people executed in Ohio
 List of people executed in the United States in 2014

References

1960 births
2014 deaths
20th-century American criminals
21st-century executions by Ohio
21st-century executions of American people
American people convicted of assault
American people convicted of kidnapping
American people convicted of rape
American people executed for murder
Deaths by person in Ohio
People executed by Ohio by lethal injection
People convicted of murder by Ohio
Political controversies in the United States
2014 in American law
2014 in Ohio
Executed people from Ohio
January 2014 events in the United States
2014 controversies in the United States